Phasmahyla guttata, the spotted leaf frog, is a species of frog in the subfamily Phyllomedusinae.
It is endemic to Brazil.  Its natural habitats are subtropical or tropical moist lowland forests, subtropical or tropical moist montane forests, and rivers. It is threatened by habitat loss.

Phasmahyla guttata uses camouflage coloring that ranges from brown to green. This use of coloring is known as polyphenism.

Their females typically lay 42± 19 eggs.

References

 

Phasmahyla
Endemic fauna of Brazil
Amphibians described in 1925
Taxonomy articles created by Polbot